Stargard was an American R&B, funk and soul girl group.

Overview
At the group's inception Stargard's members were Rochelle Runnells, Debra Anderson and Janice Williams. The vocal trio issued the "Theme Song from 'Which Way Is Up'" on the soundtrack of the 1977 feature film Which Way Is Up?. The Norman Whitfield penned track also came upon Stargard's  self-titled debut album released in 1978 on MCA Records. The album rose to numbers 12 & 26 upon the Top R&B Albums and Billboard 200 charts respectively. 
As a single "Which Way Is Up" rose to numbers 1, 12 & 21 upon the Billboard Hot R&B Songs, Dance Club Songs and Hot 100 charts respectively. "Which Way Is Up" also reached No. 19 on the UK Singles chart.

During 1978 Stargard released their sophomore album entitled What You Waitin' For. The LP's title track reached No. 4 on the Billboard Hot Soul Songs chart. The group then switched to Warner Bros. Records where in 1979 their third LP The Changing of the Gard was issued. The album was co-produced by Verdine White of Earth, Wind, & Fire. As a single "Wear It Out" rose to no. 4 upon the Billboard Dance Club Songs chart. Stargard also lent background vocals to Junior Walker's 1979 album Back Street Boogie.

Anderson went on to leave Stargard shortly after The Changing of the Gard'''s issue.  With now only Williams and Runnells in tow the duo released their Whitfield produced fourth album entitled Back 2 Back in 1980. They thereafter returned to MCA upon which their fifth LP Nine Lives was issued in 1982.

Media appearances
Stargard appeared as 'the Diamonds' in the 1978 feature film Sgt. Pepper's Lonely Hearts Club Band''.

Discography

Studio albums

Singles

References

External links
[ Stargard] at Allmusic
Stargard at Discogs

American girl groups
American dance music groups
American funk musical groups
American soul musical groups
MCA Records artists
Warner Records artists
Musical groups established in 1976
Musical groups disestablished in 1983